Oxicesta serratae is a moth in the family Noctuidae. It is found in France and Spain.

The larvae feed on Euphorbia serrata.

References

External links
Fauna Europaea
Lepiforum.de

Moths described in 1927
Hadeninae
Moths of Europe